Uganda National Examinations Board (UNEB) is a national assessment body in Uganda, established in 1983 by an act of Parliament. The UNEB Secretariat is headed by the Executive Secretary, who is the Chief Executive head and the accounting officer of the board. Under the Executive Secretary, the board is a body corporate mandated to conduct and manage examinations in Uganda at the end of the educational cycle at the primary and secondary school level and to conduct examination-related research.

Results 
Student use The Uganda National Examinations Board Portal to check their result when it's in. 007707/044

References

Education in Uganda